The Italian XXI Army Corps was a formation of the Italian army in World War II.

History 
The Corps fought in Northern Africa and took part in the Western Desert Campaign and Tunisian campaign between 1940 and 1943.
It surrendered to the allies in Tunisia in May 1943, with the rest of Army Group Africa.

Composition

in 1940 
 61st Infantry Division Sirte
 64th Infantry Division Catanzaro
 2nd CC.NN. Division "28 Ottobre"

in July 1941 
 27th Infantry Division Brescia
 17th Infantry Division Pavia
 102nd Motorised Division Trento

in May 1942 
 132nd Armoured Division Ariete
 101st Motorised Division Trieste

in October 1942 
 25th Infantry Division Bologna
 102nd Motorised Division Trento

in 1943 
 80th Infantry Division La Spezia
 16th Infantry Division Pistoia

Commanders 
 Gen. C.A. Mario Caracciolo di Feroleto (1 October 1937 – 1 December 1939)
 Gen. C.A. Lorenzo Dalmazzo (1 December 1939 – 26 September 1940)
 Gen. D. Carlo Spatocco (26 September – 20 December 1940)
 Gen. D. Enea Navarini (1 August 1941 – 14 October 1942)
 Gen. D. Alessandro Gloria (interim : 14–26 October 1942)
 Gen. C.A. Enea Navarini (26 October 1942 – 21 February 1943)
 Gen. C.A. Paolo Berardi (21 February – 12 May 1943)

Sources 
 Regio Esercito

Army corps of Italy in World War II
Western Desert campaign
Tunisian campaign